Sherwood Park is a provincial electoral district for the Legislative Assembly of Alberta, Canada.

History
The electoral district was created in the 1986 boundary redistribution from the old electoral district of Edmonton-Sherwood Park. The 2010 boundary redistribution kept the district unchanged from its 2003 boundaries.

Boundary history

Representation history

Prior to the electoral district's creation in the 1986 boundary redistribution. The Sherwood Park area had been returning Progressive Conservative MLA's in its antecedent districts since 1971.

The 1986 election returned former Member of Parliament Peter Elzinga who resigned his federal seat to run in the Alberta provincial election. He was appointed to the provincial cabinet by Premier Don Getty to serve as Minister of Agriculture.

Elzinga was re-elected in the 1989 election in a hotly contested race taking half of the popular vote. He kept his ministerial portfolio and did not run for office again in 1993 instead being hired to manage the first of a number of Progressive Conservative provincial campaigns for Premier Ralph Klein.

The 1993 election chose Liberal candidate Bruce Collingwood. The Liberals had made significant gains in the constituency the past two elections rising from 13% in 1986 to winning in 1993 with just under half the popular vote. Collingwood ran for a second term in office in 1997 but was defeated by Progressive Conservative candidate Iris Evans.

Evans was appointed to the provincial cabinet in 1999 as Minister of Children's Services. She was re-elected with a landslide majority to her second term in 2001. Her popularity dropped significantly in the 2004 election as she fell to just under half the popular vote. Evans kept her seat in cabinet and she became Minister of Health and Wellness until 2006.

After 2006 when Premier Ed Stelmach came to power Evans was appointed as Minister of Employment and Immigration which she held until the 2008 election where she was returned to her fourth term with another landslide majority. After the election she became Minister of Finance until 2010 and then Minister of Intergovernmental Relations until Stelmach retired. She was not invited back into cabinet when Premier Allison Redford came to power in the fall of 2011.

Legislature results

Elections in the 1980s

|}

|}

Elections in the 1990s

|}

|}

Elections in the 2000s

|}

|}

|}

Elections in the 2010s

Senate nominee results

2004 Senate nominee election district results
Voters had the option of selecting 4 Candidates on the Ballot

2012 Senate nominee election district results

Student Vote results

2004 election

On November 19, 2004 a Student Vote was conducted at participating Alberta schools to parallel the 2004 Alberta general election results. The vote was designed to educate students and simulate the electoral process for persons who have not yet reached the legal majority. The vote was conducted in 80 of the 83 provincial electoral districts with students voting for actual election candidates. Schools with a large student body that reside in another electoral district had the option to vote for candidates outside of the electoral district then where they were physically located.

2012 election

References

External links 
Legislative Assembly of Alberta

Alberta provincial electoral districts
Sherwood Park